Charles of Austria (7 August 1590 – 28 December 1624), nicknamed the Posthumous, a member of the Imperial House of Habsburg, was Prince-Bishop of Wrocław (Breslau) from 1608, Prince-Bishop of Brixen from 1613, and Grand Master of the Teutonic Order from 1618 until his death. In 1621 he also received the Bohemian County of Kladsko as a fief from the hands of his brother, Emperor Ferdinand II.

Life
Born in Graz, Styria, Charles was the youngest son of Archduke Charles II of Austria (1540–1590), ruling over the Inner Austrian estates of the Habsburg monarchy, and his consort Maria Anna (1551–1608), daughter of the Wittelsbach duke Albert V of Bavaria. Born less than a month after his father's death, he was nicknamed "Charles the Posthumous" (Karl der Posthume). As the last of 15 siblings, Charles, like his brother Leopold V was destined for an ecclesiastical career.

In 1602 he was appointed to a canonry of Salzburg Cathedral and in 1605 to a canonry of Passau. Further canonries in Trent and Brixen followed in 1606, and in Cologne Cathedral in 1618. These were for the most part absentee appointments that provided him with an income from ecclesiastical revenues. On 7 July 1608, at the age of 17, he was elected Prince-bishop at Breslau (Wrocław); he entered the city on December 14. In 1613 Charles also became Bishop of Brixen, however, he left the governance of the diocese to an administrator as he had chosen Neisse (Nysa) for his permanent residence. He did not receive holy orders until 1615, due to his young age. In 1619 he succeeded his cousin Archduke Maximilian III of Austria as Grand Master (Hochmeister) of the Teutonic Knights.

Charles was a staunch Catholic. Upon his appointment as Breslau prince-bishop, he strongly protested against the 1609 Letter of Majesty, issued by his cousin Emperor Rudolf II to treat all religions equally in the Bohemian crown land of Silesia, and failed to succeed as a Silesian Landeshauptmann governor. When after the outbreak of the Thirty Years' War in 1618 the Protestant Silesian estates rebelled and acknowledged Frederick V of the Palatinate as king, the prince-bishop fled to the Polish court of King Sigismund III Vasa and later moved to Brixen. After the 1620 Battle of White Mountain he returned to forcefully reintroduce Catholicism in his Duchy of Nysa. He founded a Jesuit college Carolinum(Nysa) there in 1622. After he had received the Bohemian County of Kladsko from Emperor Ferdinand II in 1621, he had the area likewise occupied by Imperial troops and forcefully reverted to Catholicism.

In 1624 he travelled to Madrid, at the request of his nephew King Philip IV of Spain, who planned to appoint him Viceroy of Portugal. However, he fell seriously ill and died in late December before taking up his post. His mortal remains were buried in the Royal Site of San Lorenzo de El Escorial, while his heart was transferred to the newly erected St Mary's Jesuit Church in Nysa.

Ancestors

References

17th-century House of Habsburg
Grand Masters of the Teutonic Order
1590 births
1624 deaths
Prince-Bishops of Breslau
Bishops of Brixen
Burials in the Pantheon of Infantes at El Escorial
Sons of monarchs